John Edward Martin, Sr., (November 15, 1891 – December 9, 1968) was an American politician and jurist from Wisconsin.  He was the 16th Chief Justice of the Wisconsin Supreme Court and 29th Attorney General of Wisconsin.

Early life and education

Born in Green Bay, Wisconsin, to Mary Ellen Wigman Martin and Patrick Henry Martin. A Roman Catholic, he was educated at parochial and public schools in Green Bay, graduating from Green Bay East High School in 1909. He attended the University of Wisconsin–Madison and Marquette University, and graduated from Notre Dame Law School in 1916 to become a practicing attorney.

World War I

He enlisted in the U.S. Army in August 1917, and was commissioned a lieutenant after attending officer training at Fort Sheridan, Illinois.  He fought in World War I as a first lieutenant in Company E, 127th Infantry Regiment, 32nd Division. He was wounded during the war, and awarded a Purple Heart.  He was honorably discharged as a captain in 1921. During the war, he served alongside future Wisconsin Supreme Court justices Theodore G. Lewis, Edward J. Gehl, and Roland J. Steinle.

Public office

After the war, Martin returned to Green Bay and practiced law, partnering with his father and his uncle, Joseph Martin, who would also later serve on the Wisconsin Supreme Court.  In 1933, John was appointed an assistant district attorney in Milwaukee.  

In 1938, Martin was elected Wisconsin Attorney General, defeating incumbent Progressive Orland Steen Loomis.  He would go on to serve nearly a decade in that office, earning re-election in 1940, 1942, 1944, and 1946.  

In June, 1948, he was appointed to the Wisconsin Supreme Court by Governor Oscar Rennebohm to fill the vacancy created by the death of Justice Chester A. Fowler. Martin was elected in 1950 to complete the remainder of Fowler's term, and was elected to a full term in 1951.  He became chief justice in 1957 upon the retirement of Chief Justice Edward T. Fairchild. In 1961, Martin was the first Wisconsinite to serve as chair of the National Conference of Chief Justices. Martin did not seek re-election in 1961, and his term expired January 1962.  However, after his term, he was appointed the first court administrator of Wisconsin.

He retired due to poor health in 1967.

Personal life and family

Martin was married to Mary Kerwin; they had two children, John Jr. and Mary Hope.  

Martin died December 9, 1968, in Madison, Wisconsin.  He was buried at Resurrection Cemetery, in northwest Madison.

Electoral history

Wisconsin Attorney General (1938-1946)

| colspan="6" style="text-align:center;background-color: #e9e9e9;"| Primary Election

| colspan="6" style="text-align:center;background-color: #e9e9e9;"| General Election

| colspan="6" style="text-align:center;background-color: #e9e9e9;"| Primary Election

| colspan="6" style="text-align:center;background-color: #e9e9e9;"| General Election

| colspan="6" style="text-align:center;background-color: #e9e9e9;"| Primary Election

| colspan="6" style="text-align:center;background-color: #e9e9e9;"| General Election

| colspan="6" style="text-align:center;background-color: #e9e9e9;"| Primary Election

| colspan="6" style="text-align:center;background-color: #e9e9e9;"| General Election

| colspan="6" style="text-align:center;background-color: #e9e9e9;"| Primary Election

| colspan="6" style="text-align:center;background-color: #e9e9e9;"| General Election

Wisconsin Supreme Court (1950, 1951)

Notes

1891 births
1968 deaths
20th-century American judges
Politicians from Green Bay, Wisconsin
Military personnel from Wisconsin
University of Wisconsin–Madison alumni
Notre Dame Law School alumni
Wisconsin Attorneys General
Chief Justices of the Wisconsin Supreme Court
Green Bay East High School alumni